The grammar of Classical Nahuatl is agglutinative, head-marking, and makes extensive use of compounding, noun incorporation and derivation. That is, it can add many different prefixes and suffixes to a root until very long words are formed. Very long verbal forms or nouns created by incorporation, and accumulation of prefixes are common in literary works. New words can thus be easily created.

Orthography used in this article 
Vowel length was phonologically distinctive in Classical Nahuatl, but vowel length was rarely transcribed in manuscripts, leading to occasional difficulties in discerning whether a given vowel was long or short. In this article, long vowels are indicated with a macron above the vowel letter: <ā, ē, ī, ō>. Another feature which is rarely marked in manuscripts is the saltillo or glottal stop ([ʔ]). In this article, the saltillo is indicated with an h following a vowel. The grammarian Horacio Carochi (1645) represented saltillo by marking diacritics on the preceding vowel: grave accent on nonfinal vowels <à, ì, è, ò> and circumflex on final vowels <â, î, ê, ô>. Carochi is almost alone among colonial-era grammarians in consistently representing both saltillo and vowel length in transcription, even though they are both essential to a proper understanding of Classical Nahuatl.

Morphophonology
The phonological shapes of Nahuatl morphemes may be altered in particular contexts, depending on the shape of the adjacent morphemes or their position in the word.

Assimilation
Where a morpheme ending in a consonant is followed by a morpheme beginning in a consonant, one of the two consonants often undergoes assimilation, adopting features of the other consonant.

Almost all doubled consonants in Nahuatl are produced by the assimilation of two different consonants from different morphemes. Doubled consonants within a single morpheme are rare, a notable example being the verb -itta "see", and possibly indicates a fossilized double morpheme.

Morphology
The words of Nahuatl can be divided into three basic functional classes: verbs, nouns and particles. Adjectives exist, but they generally behave like nouns and there are very few adjectives that are not derived from either verbal or nominal roots. The few adverbs that can be said to exist fall into the class of particles.

Nouns
Classical Nahuatl is a non-copulative language, meaning it lacks a verb meaning 'to be.' Instead, this meaning is conveyed by simply inflecting a noun as a verb. In other words from the perspective of an English speaker, one can describe each Classical Nahuatl noun as a specific verb meaning "to be X."

Example: ti + amolnamacac 'soap seller', becomes tamolnamacac, meaning 'you are a soap seller'
(See verb inflection below).

The noun is inflected for two basic contrasting categories:

possessedness: non-possessed contrasts with possessed
number: singular contrasts with plural

Nouns belong to one of two classes: animates or inanimates. Originally the grammatical distinction between these were that inanimate nouns had no plural forms, but in most modern dialects both animate and inanimate nouns are pluralizable.

Nominal morphology is mostly suffixing. Some irregular formations exist.

Possessedness
Non-possessed nouns take a suffix called the absolutive. This suffix takes the form -tl after vowels (ā-tl, "water") and -tli after consonants, which assimilates with a final /l/ on the root (tōch-tli, "rabbit", but cal-li, "house"). Some nouns are irregular and, for the absolutive suffix, instead take -in (mich-in, fish). In most derived forms, any of these suffixes would drop: tōch-cal-li, "rabbit-hole", mich-matla-tl, "fishing net". Possessed nouns do not take the absolutive suffix (see Noun inflection below), but do receive a prefix to denote the possessor.

Number

The absolutive singular suffix has three basic forms: -tl/tli, -lin/-in, and some irregular nouns with no suffix.
The absolutive plural suffix has three basic forms: -tin, -meh, or just a final glottal stop -h. Some plurals are formed also with reduplication of the noun's first or second syllable, with the reduplicated vowel long.
The possessive singular suffix has two basic forms: -uh (on stems ending in a vowel) or -Ø (on stems ending in a consonant).
The possessive plural suffix has the form -huān.

Only animate nouns can take a plural form. These include most animate living beings, but also words like tepētl ("mountain"), citlālin ("star") and some other phenomena.

The plural is not totally stable and in many cases several different forms are attested.

Noun inflection

Possessor prefixes

If a given prefix ends with a vowel (apart from 3rd person singular), that vowel may be elided depending on the following sound. The vowel will only be elided if the word's stem begins with a "stronger" vowel.  Generally, the hierarchy of vowels, from strongest to weakest, is a/e, o, i.

Example: to + amolli, becomes tamol, meaning 'our soap'

Some other categories can be inflected on the noun such as: 
 Honorific formed with the suffix -tzin.

Inalienable possession
The suffix -yo — the same suffix as the abstract/collective -yō(tl) — may be added to a possessed noun to indicate that it is a part of its possessor, rather than just being owned by it. For example, both nonac and nonacayo (possessed forms of nacatl) mean "my meat", but nonac may refer to meat that one has to eat, while nonacayo refers to the flesh that makes up one's body. This is known as inalienable, integral or organic possession.

Derivational morphology
-tia derives from noun X a verb with an approximate meaning of "to provide with X " or "to become X."
-huia derives from noun X a verb with an approximate meaning of "to use X " or "to provide with X."
-yōtl derives from a noun X a noun with an abstract meaning of "X-hood or X-ness."
-yoh derives from a noun X a noun with a meaning of "thing full of X" or "thing with a lot of X."

Verbs 

All verbs are marked with prefixes in order to agree with the person of the subject, and, where there is one, the object. In addition, verbs take a special suffix to mark plural subjects (only animates take plural agreement).

An example of an intransitive verb, with subject marking: niyōli 'I live,' tiyōli 'you (singular) live,' yōli he, she, it lives,' tiyōlih 'we live,' anyōlih 'you (plural) live,' yōlih 'they live.'

Subject and object marking

The person prefixes are identical for all tenses and moods (with the exception of the imperative, whose prefix is x(i)-), but the plural number suffix varies according to tense or mood. In the table below, Ø- indicates there is no prefix.

Note that prefix ti- means 'you (singular)' with no number suffix on the verb, but ti- plus the plural suffix (in the present -h) means 'we'.

The imperative prefixes can only be used in the second person; for other persons, use the optative mood.

As mentioned previously, verbal subject prefixes can also be used with nouns, to create a nominal predicate: nicihuātl 'I am a woman,' toquichtli 'you are a man,' 'nimēxicah 'we are Mexica.'

Transitive and bitransitive verbs take a distinct set of prefixes (after the subject marking, but before the stem), to mark the object:

The object always must be marked on a transitive verb. If the object is unknown or is simply 'things/people in general' the unspecified object prefixes may be used. Compare niccua 'I am eating it (i.e. something specific)' to nitlacua 'I am eating'.

Plural suffixes are never used to mark plural objects, only plural subjects. Unspecified objects are never plural.

A Classical Nahuatl verb thus has the following structure:

SUBJECT PREFIX + OBJECT PREFIX + VERB STEM + SUBJECT NUMBER (example: ti-quim-itta-h, we – them – see – plural, i.e., 'we see them')

Direct arguments of the verb – that is, subject and object – are obligatorily marked on the verb. If there are both direct and indirect objects (which are not morphologically distinguished), only one may be marked on the verb.

Other inflectional categories may be optionally marked, for example direction of motion. Other inflections include the applicative and causative, both valency changing operations; that is, they increase the number of arguments associated with a verb, transforming an intransitive verb into transitive, or a transitive verb into bitransitive.

Tense and mood inflection

The different tenses and moods are formed, somewhat as in Latin or Ancient Greek, by adding the person inflections to the appropriate verbal base or stem. Base 1 is the normal or citation form of the verb, also known as the imperfective stem, with no special suffixes. Base 2, also known as the perfective stem, is usually shorter in form than base 1, often dropping a final vowel, though formation thereof varies. Base 3, the hypothetical stem, is normally the same as base 1, except for verbs whose stem ending in two vowels, in which case the second vowel is dropped, and the stem vowel is often lengthened in front of a suffix.

Imperfective tenses

The present tense is formed from base 1. The plural subject suffix is -h. Examples: nicochi 'I am sleeping,' tlahtoah 'they are speaking,' nicchīhua 'I am making it.'

The imperfect is similar in meaning to the imperfect in the Romance languages. It is formed with base 1, plus -ya or -yah in the plural. Sometimes the final vowel of the stem is lengthened. Examples: nicochiya 'I was sleeping,' tlahtoāyah 'they used to speak,' nicchīhuaya 'I was making it.'

The habitual present, customary present, or quotidian tense is formed from base 1. The suffix is -ni, with the stem vowels sometimes lengthened before it. Rather than one specific event this tense expresses the subject's tendency or propensity to repeatedly or habitually perform the same action over time (e.g. miquini 'mortal,' lit. '(one who is) prone to die'. It is frequently translated into English with a noun or noun phrase, for example: cuīcani 'one who sings, singer,' tlahcuiloāni (from ihcuiloa 'write, paint') 'scribe,' or 'tlahtoāni' (from ihtoa 'speak') the title for the ruler of a Mexica city. Plural formation of this form is variable. It can be in -nih or -nimeh. In some cases, the plural does not use -ni at all but instead a preterite ending, as with tlahtohqueh, the plural of tlahtoāni, or tlahcuilohqueh, the plural of tlahcuiloāni. These preterite forms are also used to create possessive forms.

Perfective tenses

The preterite or perfect tense is similar in meaning to the English simple past or present perfect. The singular often ends in -h or -c while the plural suffix is -queh. The preterite is often accompanied by the prefix ō- (sometimes called the augment, or antecessive prefix). The function of this prefix is to mark that the action of the verb is complete at the time of speaking (or in a subordinate clause, at the time of the action described by the main verb). The augment is frequently absent in mythic or historical narratives. Examples: ōnicoch 'I slept,' ōtlatohqueh 'they spoke,' ōnicchīuh 'I made it.' The preterite also can be used to create agentive constructions.

The pluperfect uses the augment, but with the suffix -ca in the singular and -cah in the plural. The pluperfect roughly corresponds with the English past perfect, although more precisely it indicates that a particular action or state was in effect in the past but that it has been undone or reversed at the time of speaking. Examples: ōnicochca 'I had slept,' ōtlatohcah 'they had spoken,' ōnicchīuhca 'I had made it.

The vetitive or admonitive mood issues a warning that something may come to pass which the speaker does not desire, and by implication steps should be taken to avoid this (compare the English conjunction lest). The negative of this mood simply warns that a non-occurrence of the action is undesirable. If the preterite singular ends in -c this is replaced by the glottal stop/saltillo. In the plural the ending is -(h)tin or -(h)tih. The admonitive is used in conjunction with particles mā or nēn. Examples: mā nicoch 'be careful, lest I sleep,' mā tlatohtin 'watch out, they may speak,' mā nicchīuh 'don't let me make it.'

Hypothetical tenses

The future tense has a suffix -z in the singular and -zqueh in the plural. Examples of the future: nicochiz 'I will sleep,' tlahtōzqueh 'they will speak,' nicchīhuaz 'I will make it.'

The imperative and optative use the plural suffix -cān. The imperative uses the special imperative subject prefixes, available only in the second person; the optative uses the normal subject prefixes (effectively it is the same mood, but outside of the second person). The imperative is used for commands, the optative is used for wishes or desires, both used in conjunction with particles: mā nicchīhua 'let me make it!'

The conditional, irrealis, or counterfactual are all names for the same verbal mood. The suffix is -zquiya (sometimes spelled -zquia) in the singular and -zquiyah in the plural. The basic meaning is that a state or action that was intended or desired did not come to pass. It can be translated as 'would have,' 'almost,' etc. Examples: nicochizquiya 'I would have slept,' tlahtōzquiyah 'they would have spoken,' nicchīhuazquiya 'I would have made it.'

Applicative
The applicative construction adds an argument to the verb. The role of the added argument can be benefactive, malefactive, indirect object or similar. It is formed by the suffix -lia.niquittilia "I see it for him"

Causative
The causative construction also adds an argument to the verb. This argument is an agent causing the object to undertake the action of the verb. It is formed by the suffix -tia.niquittatia  "I make him see it/I show it to him"

Unspecified Subject/Impersonal/Passive
This construction, based on what Andrews calls the "nonactive" stem, is used for the passive voice of transitive verbs and for the "unspecified subject" or "impersonal" construction of both transitive and intransitive verbs. It is derived by adding to an imperfective active stem one of the simple endings -ō, -lō or -hua, or one of the combinations -o-hua, -lo-hua or -hua-lō (a free variant with -hua). Note that -(l)ō is shortened to -(l)o word-finally, according to the general phonological rule that word-finally or before a glottal stop long vowels are reduced.

The rules for which suffix is added to a given verb stem involve both phonology and transitivity. The suffix -lō is the most common, whereas -lo-hua (note the short vowel, also in -o-hua) is suffixed only to a small number of irregular verbs. In the case of the irregular compound verbs huī-tz "come," and tla-(i)tqui-tz and tla-huīca-tz both meaning "bring something," -lo-hua is suffixed to the embedded verb, i.e. before -tz.huītz / tlatquitz / tlahuīcatz > huīlohuatz / itquilohuatz / huīcalohuatzFor transitive verbs being made passive, the subject is discarded and the last-added object becomes the subject.tiquincui "you (s.) take them (something animate, e.g. dogs) > cuīloh "they are taken"tinēchincuīlia "you (s.) take them (animate) from me" > niquincuīlīlo "I am deprived of them, someone takes them from me" — note that the 3rd-person plural object prefix, contracted to -im-/in- after -nēch-, returns to its full form -quim-/-quin- when a preceding object prefix is removed. 

For the impersonal or "unspecified subject" construction, meaning that "one does" or "people do" or sometimes "everyone does" (the action of the verb), the nonactive stem of an intransitive verb is used as is, since an intransitive verb cannot be passive; a transitive verb takes the nonspecific object prefixes -tē- and/or -tla- and the secondary reflexive object prefix -ne-, but cannot take specific object prefixes.miqui "he dies" > micohua "there is dying, people are dying"cuīcayah "they (specific people) were singing" > cuīcōya "people were singing, everyone was singing, there was singing"tizahuinih "we customarily abstain from food" > titozahuanih "we customarily make ourselves abstain from food, we customarily fast" (reflexive causative, more common since it implies intentionality) > nezahualo "people customarily fast, everyone customarily fasts"anquintlacualtiah "you (p.) feed them" > tētlacualtīlo "people feed people, people are fed"

Directional affixes
Deixis:-on-  "away from the speaker"on+ tlahtoa "to speak" = ontlahtoa "he/she/it speaks towards there"-huāl- " towards the speaker"huāl+ tlahtoa "to speak" =  huāllahtoa "he/she/it speaks towards here"

Introvert: 
Imperfective: -qui  "comes towards the speaker in order to X"qui + itta "to see" + qui ="quittaqui "he/she/it will come here to see it" 
Perfective: -co  "has come towards the speaker in order to X"qui + itta "to see" + co =quittaco "he/she/it has come here to see it"

Extrovert:
Imperfective: -tīuh "goes away from the speaker in order to X"qui + itta "to see" + tīuh ="quittatīuh "he/she/it will go there to see it" 
Perfective: -to " has gone away from the speaker in order to X"qui + itta "to see" + to =quittato "he/she/it has gone there to see it"

Derivational
A number of different suffixes exist to derive nouns from verbs:-lli used to derive passivized nouns from verbs.-liztli  used to derive abstract nouns from verbs.-qui used to derive agentive nouns from verbs.

Verbal compounds
Two verbs can be compounded with the ligature morpheme -ti-.

Relational Nouns and Locatives
Spatial and other relations are expressed with relational nouns. Some locative suffixes also exist.

Noun Incorporation
Noun incorporation is productive in Classical Nahuatl and different kinds of material can be incorporated.
Body parts
Instruments
Objects

Syntax
The particle in is important in Nahuatl syntax and is used as a kind of definite article and also as a subordinating particle and a deictic particle, in addition to having other functions.

Non-configurationality
Classical Nahuatl can be classified as a non-configurational language, allowing many different kinds of word orders, even splitting noun phrases.

VSO basic word order
The basic word order of Classical Nahuatl is verb initial and often considered to be VSO, but some scholars have argued for it being VOS. However, the language being non-configurational, all word orders are allowed and are used to express different kinds of pragmatic relations, such as thematization and focus.

Nouns as predicates

An important feature of Classical Nahuatl is that any noun can function as a standalone predicate. For example, calli is commonly translated "house" but could also be translated "(it) is a house".

As predicates, nouns can take the verbal subject prefixes (but not tense inflection). Thus, nitēuctli means "I am a lord" with the regular first person singular subject ni- attached to the noun tēuctli "lord". Similarly tinocihuāuh means "you are my wife", with the possessive noun nocihuāuh "my wife" attached to the subject prefix ti- "you" (singular). This construction is also seen in the name Tītlācahuān meaning "we are his slaves", a name for the god Tezcatlipoca.

Number system

Classical Nahuatl has a vigesimal or base 20 number system. In the pre-Columbian Nahuatl script, the numbers 20, 400 (202) and 8,000 (203) were represented by a flag, a feather, and a bag, respectively.

It also makes use of numeral classifiers, similar to languages such as Chinese and Japanese.

Basic numbers

Compound numbers
Multiples of 20, 400 or 8,000 are formed by replacing cēm- or cēn- with another number. E.g. ōmpōhualli "40" (2×20), mahtlāctzontli "4,000" (10×400), nāuhxiquipilli "32,000" (4×8,000).

The numbers in between those above—11 to 14, 16 to 19, 21 to 39, and so forth—are formed by following the larger number with a smaller number which is to be added to the larger one. The smaller number is prefixed with om- or on-, or in the case of larger units, preceded by īpan "on it" or īhuān "with it". E.g. mahtlāctli oncē "11" (10+1), caxtōlonēyi "18" (15+3), cēmpōhualmahtlāctli omōme "32" (20+10+2); cēntzontli caxtōlpōhualpan nāuhpōhualomōme "782" (1×400+15×20+4×20+2). 

Classifiers
Depending on the objects being counted, Nahuatl may use a classifier or counter word. These include:-tetl for small, round objects (literally "rock")-pāntli for counting rows-tlamantli for foldable or stackable things-ōlōtl for roundish or oblong-shaped things (literally "maize cob")
Which classifier a particular object takes is loose and somewhat arbitrary.

Ordinal numbers
Ordinal numbers (first, second, third, etc.) are formed by preceding the number with ic or inic''.

Notes

References

 
 
  
 
  
   
 
 
 
 
 
 

Native American grammars
Classical Nahuatl